In the 2019–20 season, USM Alger competed in the Ligue 1 for the 42nd season, as well as the Algerian Cup.  It was their 25th consecutive season in the top flight of Algerian football. They also competed in the Champions League, and the Algerian Cup.

During the campaign, the club were plagued by major financial problems after the club owner Ali Haddad was jailed, which froze the official account of the club, leaving them unable to pay the salaries of the players, technical staff and other workers.

On March 15, 2020, the Ligue de Football Professionnel (LFP) decided to halt the season due to the COVID-19 pandemic in Algeria. On July 29, 2020, the LFP declared that season is over and CR Belouizdad to be the champion, the promotion of four teams from the League 2, and scraping the relegation for the current season.

Summary
On June 2, 2019, it was announced on Echourouk TV that the Haddad family was selling its shares in SSPA USMA, of which it held 92%.

The club lost several key players including Abderrahmane Meziane, who moved to Al Ain. and Raouf Benguit to Espérance ST. also Farouk Chafaï Mokhtar Benmoussa and Prince Ibara to K Beerschot. On 26 July, USM Alger squad went to Tunisia for a ten-day internship The cost was paid by a friend from Tunisia because of the continued freezing of their financial account. On 4 August, Al-Hayat Petroleum Company decided to pay the cost of travel to Niger in order to play the preliminary round of the CAF Champions League, the same company that wants to buy the majority of the shares of the club. On 4 September, The players of USM Alger decided to go on strike to protest difficult financial situation They stressed that this decision has nothing to do with the administration, the fans or the club itself. It is a protest movement against the state of the USM Alger and the delay in resolving the crisis, As a reminder, the USM Alger players have not received their salaries for 6 months, while the new ones have not received any salary since joining the club.

On 13 October, The players decided to boycott the training and official matches because they have not been paid for five months, two days after Amine Tirmane club's communication officer He submitted his resignation on the channel Dzaïr TV, a day later a fan paid the amount of 500,000 dinars per player reward win against Gor Mahia and AS Aïn M'lila, The players then decide to return to training and play CA Bordj Bou Arreridj match on October 23. After a protest in front of the headquarters of the Ministry of Youth and Sports against the difficult situation, Minister Raouf Salim Bernaoui said to supporters of the club They have to be patient.

On 19 October, Nearly 5,000 supporters of USM Alger went out to The headquarters of the Wilaya of Algiers to protest against the club's difficult financial situation and free it from ETRHB Haddad Company. A day after Mounir D'bichi said to France 24 that Al-Hayat Petroleum is a subsidiary of ETRHB Haddad which also said that the team's debts amount to 1,020,000,000 DA about 8 million euros. D'bichi said ETRHB Haddad had provided 400 billion centimes since its arrival about 23 million euros. On 22 October, Oussama Chita resumed training with his teammates after a long absence due to a serious injury contracted by the Algerian international last season at the knee.

On October 29, 2019, The leaders of USM Algiers have announced in a statement that the sponsorship deal with Kia Al Djazair will be terminated amicably and the club will recover all outstanding debts that are valued at nearly 20 billion centimes (1.4 million €) In addition, the contract with Ifri will not be renewed either by decision of the company. On November 5, the administration of USM Alger signed Sponsor contract with Serport specialized in port services for 16 billion centimes about 1.2 million euros. The administration of USM Alger to regain its right in the Darby case, appealed the arbitration decision issued by the Algerian Court for the settlement of sports disputes in case No. 92/19 between Union sportive de la médina d'Alger against the Algerian Football Federation and the Professional Football Association. This was the receipt of the receipt of the appeal from the Court of Arbitration for Sport in Lausanne on 8 January 2020 and the team paid the costs of registering the case with an amount of one thousand euros (€1000 ) on the morning of 9 January.

Pre-season and friendlies

Competitions

Overview

{| class="wikitable" style="text-align: center"
|-
!rowspan=2|Competition
!colspan=8|Record
!rowspan=2|Started round
!rowspan=2|Final position / round
!rowspan=2|First match
!rowspan=2|Last match
|-
!
!
!
!
!
!
!
!
|-
| Ligue 1

| 
| 6th
| 15 August 2019
| 14 March 2020
|-
| Algerian Cup

| Round of 64
| Round of 32
| 5 January 2020
| 13 February 2020
|-
| Champions League

| Preliminary round
| Group Stage
| 9 August 2019
| 1 February 2020
|-
! Total

Ligue 1

League table

Results summary

Results by round

Matches
On 29 July 2019, the Algerian Ligue Professionnelle 1 fixtures were announced.

Algerian Cup

Champions League

Preliminary round

First round

Group stage

Group C

Squad information

Playing statistics

Appearances (Apps.) numbers are for appearances in competitive games only including sub appearances
Red card numbers denote:   Numbers in parentheses represent red cards overturned for wrongful dismissal.

(B) – USM Alger B player

Goalscorers
Includes all competitive matches. The list is sorted alphabetically by surname when total goals are equal.

Penalties

Clean sheets
Includes all competitive matches.

Hat-tricks

(H) – Home ; (A) – Away

Squad list
Players and squad numbers last updated on 1 May 2020.Note: Flags indicate national team as has been defined under FIFA eligibility rules. Players may hold more than one non-FIFA nationality.

Transfers

In

Out

Notes

References

2019-20
Algerian football clubs 2019–20 season
2019–20 CAF Champions League participants seasons